Belarus will be represented by 42 athletes  at the 2010 European Athletics Championships held in Barcelona, Spain.

Participants

Men

Track and road events

Field events

1 Mikhnevich originally won the gold medal in 21.01 m in the final and 20.35 (4 Q) in qualification) but were disqualified in 2013 (his results from 2005 World Championships was canceled).

Combined events

Women

Track and road events

Field events

Combined events

Results

References 

Participants list (men)
Participants list (women)

Nations at the 2010 European Athletics Championships
2010
European Athletics Championships